Ratt is an American glam metal band from San Diego, California. Formed in 1977 under the name Mickey Ratt, the group originally included lead vocalist and guitarist Stephen Pearcy, lead guitarist Chris Hager, bassist Tim Garcia and drummer Bob Eisenberg. In 1982, Ratt finalised its "classic lineup" of Pearcy, lead guitarist Warren DeMartini, rhythm guitarist Robbin Crosby, bassist Juan Croucier and drummer Bobby Blotzer, that lasted through 1991. Though the band has been through numerous lineup changes, in the ensuing years, and currently consists of Stephen Pearcy, Juan Croucier (both of whom rejoined in 2016), lead guitarist Jordan Ziff and drummer Pete Holmes (who joined in 2018), and rhythm guitarist Frankie Lindia who joined in mid-2021.

History

1977–1983
Ratt originally formed in San Diego, California in 1977 under the name Mickey Ratt. The band originally included lead vocalist and rhythm guitarist Stephen Pearcy, lead guitarist Chris Hager, bassist and backing vocalist Tim Garcia, and drummer Bob Eisenberg. After John Turner took over from Eisenberg, the band relocated to Los Angeles in January 1980. Garcia opted to return to San Diego not long after, and was replaced by Dave Jellison a few months later. Paul DeNisco briefly joined as a second guitarist. After a few years of touring, Hager left in 1981 to pursue other projects, with Turner and Jellison following not long after. Pearcy rebuilt the band with the addition of guitarists Jake E. Lee and Bob DeLellis, bassist Matt Thorr and drummer Dave Alford, as well as renaming it M. Ratt and, later, Ratt.

The lineup lasted only a few months, with Alford and Lee quitting after Pearcy fired DeLellis without consulting them. The pair subsequently formed Rough Cutt together. Thorr remained the band's bassist, alongside new additions Warren DeMartini and Robbin Crosby on guitars, and Khurt Maier on drums. This lineup recorded "Tell the World" for the first edition of the Metal Blade compilation Metal Massacre. Thorr was briefly replaced by Gene Hunter, however by the end of the year the group had finalised its classic lineup of Pearcy, DeMartini, Crosby, bassist Juan Croucier and drummer Bobby Blotzer. Marq Torien briefly joined on guitar in 1982. Joey Cristofanilli temporarily took over from Croucier in 1983, but he returned once he left Dokken later in the year.

1983–2012
Ratt's lineup remained constant throughout the rest of the 1980s, as they released a series of commercially successful albums. In 1991, Crosby was forced to leave the group due to a "debilitating addiction to heroin". He was temporarily replaced by Michael Schenker for a series of tour dates. In early 1992, Pearcy opted to leave Ratt to form the supergroup Arcade. As a result, the group was subsequently disbanded. In 1996, the band reunited with Pearcy, DeMartini and Blotzer joined by bassist Robbie Crane, after plans for a full classic lineup reunion fell through. Keri Kelli joined as a second guitarist in early 1999, in time for a tour starting in May. In January 2000, however, Pearcy suddenly left the band just before the start of a tour. Kelli also left shortly after the vocalist's departure.

Pearcy and Kelli were replaced by former L.A. Guns frontman Jizzy Pearl and former Mötley Crüe frontman John Corabi, respectively. Robert Mason was initially invited to take over on vocals, but he declined. Classic lineup guitarist Crosby died on June 6, 2002 after contracting HIV and overdosing on heroin. Pearl remained the band's vocalist until December 2006, when he left amid rumors of a classic lineup reunion. A few months later, it was confirmed that Pearcy was returning for tour dates throughout 2007. Corabi remained until August 2008, when he was replaced by former Quiet Riot guitarist Carlos Cavazo. After the band released its first studio album in 11 years, Infestation, in 2010, Crane announced in March 2012 that he had left Ratt to focus on Lynch Mob, which he joined in 2010.

2012 onwards
Croucier returned to take Crane's place in May 2012. Blotzer was temporarily replaced for a run of shows in early 2014, as he had yet to recover from neck surgery he underwent the previous October. In April 2014, Pearcy announced that he had left Ratt for a third time, blaming the "constant turmoil" and other controversies surrounding the band. The following September, Blotzer rebranded his new group from Bobby Blotzer's Ratt Experience to simply Ratt, having "taken control" of the brand, with the drummer joined by lead vocalist Joshua Alan, guitarists Michael "Doc" Ellis and Nicolas "Blaze" Baum, and bassist Scotty Griffin. DeMartini later sued Blotzer over the use of the Ratt name, however this was denied by a court ruling. Griffin was replaced by Robbie Crane in February 2016, and both Blaze and Crane left in August. They were replaced initially by Stacey Blades and Todd Kerns, respectively, and later on a more permanent basis by Mitch Perry and Brad Lang. Blades remained as a replacement for Ellis. Alan left the band in January 2017 to pursue other projects. He was replaced by Seann Nichols, although the band performed only one show and has been inactive since March 2017.

In November 2016, Pearcy, DeMartini and Croucier regained ownership of the Ratt name from Blotzer, expelling him from the original partnership and reforming the band with Carlos Cavazo and Jimmy DeGrasso. The band returned to touring, but in March 2018 it was reported that DeMartini had been fired from the band. A few days later, Cavazo confirmed the news and added that he had also left the band. In June, Pearcy and Croucier assured that they would continue with Ratt, and the following month the group returned with new members Jordan Ziff on lead guitar, Chris Sanders on rhythm guitar and Pete Holmes on drums. Sanders was later replaced by former David Lee Roth guitarist Frankie Lindia.

Members

Current members

Former members

Blotzer's Ratt members

Timelines
Ratt (1977–1992, 1996–2014, 2016–present)

Bobby Blotzer's Ratt Experience/Bobby Blotzer's Ratt (2015–2017)

Lineups

Bibliography

References

External links
Ratt official website

|}

Ratt